Cooper Barrett's Guide to Surviving Life (originally announced as The Guide to Surviving Life before reverting to its original working title) is an American television sitcom created by Jay Lacopo. It debuted online on December 21, 2015, and made its television premiere on January 3, 2016, on Fox, with 13 episodes ordered. The series follows Cooper Barrett (Jack Cutmore-Scott) and his friends and family while exploring what we all go through on our way to figuring out what life is all about. On May 12, 2016, Fox cancelled the series, leaving three episodes unaired. The network burned off two of the unaired episodes on June 12, 2016, with the last one airing on June 26, 2016.

Cast

Main
 Jack Cutmore-Scott as Cooper Barrett
 Meaghan Rath as Kelly Bishop, a neighbor of Cooper who steals his heart.
 James Earl as Barry Sandel, a roommate of Cooper who can't stay out of trouble.
 Charlie Saxton as Neal Fissley, a roommate of Cooper who seems to fail at love.
 Liza Lapira as Leslie Barrett, Cooper's sister-in-law, Josh's wife, and mother to Gracie.
 Justin Bartha as Josh Barrett, Cooper's older brother, Leslie's husband, and father to Gracie.

Recurring
 Marshall Manesh as Virgil, the landlord
 Victoria Justice as Ramona Miller, a corporate shark who befriends Kelly.

Guest stars
 Paula Abdul as a hallucination of herself
 Colin Cowherd as himself
 Kimberly Kevon Williams as Ashley, Barry's girlfriend. 
 Corey Reynolds as Frank, Ashley's father.
 Lyndon Smith as Lena, one of Cooper's ex-girlfriends who finds a way back in his life.
 Parker Young as Shane, an extremely competitive guy who briefly dates Kelly.
 Alan Ruck and Jane Kaczmarek as Mark and Cindy Barrett, Cooper and Josh's parents.
 Juicy J as himself

Episodes

Broadcast
Initially being shown in a Sunday 8:30pm timeslot, it was moved to 7:30pm from the eighth episode onwards. After lasting three episodes there, the series was pulled, and returned in June for the remaining three episodes at 7pm, with the exception of the twelfth at 7:30pm. 

The show was acquired for broadcast in a few international markets; Sweden in April 2016, Poland in May 2016, Italy in fall 2016 on Fox, Germany in January 2018, and later in the United Kingdom by FOX, set to air in May 2021, as part of a number of one-season US sitcoms imported to fill their schedule during the COVID-19 pandemic.

Reception
The show has met an average response from critics. On Metacritic, it has a score of 51/100 based on 14 reviews. On Rotten Tomatoes, it has a score of 50% based on 19 reviews, with an average rating of 5.3/10. The critical consensus reads: "Cooper Barrett's Guide to Surviving Life wins points for earnestness and a slight progressive slant, but an overall lack of smarts or structure keeps the show from living up to its full potential."

References

External links
 
 

2010s American single-camera sitcoms
2016 American television series debuts
2016 American television series endings
English-language television shows
Fox Broadcasting Company original programming
Television series by 20th Century Fox Television
Television shows set in Los Angeles
Television shows filmed in Los Angeles